INS Delhi is the lead ship of her class of guided-missile destroyers of the Indian Navy. She was built at the Mazagon Dock Limited in Mumbai and commissioned on 15 November 1997. This class is among the largest warships to be designed and built in India.
The Ship was undergoing midlife upgrades from 2018. As of April 2022, she was back in service with Sensor upgrades and new 'Modular Launcher' for Brahmos Missile as a replacement for KH 35E. A Brahmos test was carried out from the ship on 19 April 2022.

Delhi is the second vessel of the Indian Navy to bear the name.

Operations

During May–July 2009, INS Delhi led the Indian Navy task force on deployment to Europe. During this deployment, the task force participated in joint-exercises with the Royal Navy and the French Navy. Exercise Konkan-09 with the Royal Navy, was conducted off the coast of the United Kingdom. Exercise Varuna 2009 with the French Navy was off the coast of France.

As of 2020, Delhi was undergoing a mid-life refit that includes upgrades for several weapons and sensors. The Kh-35E Uran missiles will be replaced by BrahMos missiles, which was originally sanctioned in 2015. The Shtil-1 air defence system will replace the 9K-90 Uragan, with Fregat M2EM radar replacing the Fregat-MAE. The Kite Screech fire control system of the AK-100 is being replaced by BEL Lynx U2. The electronics warfare system will be upgraded to Ellora Mk II, with Kavach decoy launchers. Atlas Elektronik ACTAS towed-array sonar will also be installed. The BrahMos integration was validated with a test firing on 19 April 2022.

References

 

Delhi-class destroyers
Destroyers of the Indian Navy
Ships built in India
1995 ships